Phenyl isothiocyanate (PITC) is a reagent used in reversed phase HPLC. PITC is less sensitive than o-phthaldehyde (OPA) and cannot be fully automated. PITC can be used for analysing secondary amines, unlike OPA. It is also known as Edman's reagent and is used in Edman degradation.

Commercially available, this compound may be synthesized by the reaction of aniline with carbon disulfide and concentrated ammonia to give the ammonium dithiocarbamate salt of aniline in the first step, which on further reaction with lead(II) nitrate gives phenyl isothiocyanate:

Another method of synthesizing this reagent involves a Sandmeyer reaction using aniline, sodium nitrite and copper(I) thiocyanate.

A use of phenylisothiocyanate is in the synthesis of linogliride.

See also 
 Isothiocyanate
 Naphthyl isothiocyanate

References

Isothiocyanates
Foul-smelling chemicals